Carlia decora, the elegant rainbow skink, is a species of skink in the genus Carlia. It is native to Queensland in Australia.

References

Carlia
Reptiles described in 2012 
Endemic fauna of Australia
Skinks of Australia
Taxa named by Conrad J. Hoskin
Taxa named by Patrick J. Couper